The 2003 Sparkassen Cup doubles was the tennis doubles event of the thirteenth and final edition of the Sparkassen Cup; a WTA Tier II tournament held in Leipzig, Germany.

Alexandra Stevenson and Serena Williams were the defending champions, but Williams elected not to compete this year. Stevenson instead partnered Anastasia Myskina, but lost in the quarterfinals to Elena Likhovtseva and Nadia Petrova.

Top seeds Svetlana Kuznetsova and Martina Navratilova won the title, defeating Likhovtseva and Petrova in the final, 3–6, 6–1, 6–3.

Seeds

Draw

Draw

Qualifying

Seeds

Qualifiers
 ''' Anikó Kapros /  Lydia Steinbach

Draw

External links
 2003 Sparkassen Cup Draw

Sparkassen Cup (tennis)
2003 WTA Tour